Oleg Woolf (1954-2011) was a Moldavian-Soviet writer. He trained as a physicist, and went on several geophysical expeditions in the former USSR. He was married to Irina Mashinski; together they founded the bilingual press Stosvet and its journal Cardinal Points. As a writer, Woolf wrote short stories, essays, and poetry, and he was regularly published in literary journals and anthologies. His books include:

  (We Will See Sosnov in Spring) (New York: Stosvet Press, 2010) 
  (Bessarabian Stamps) (New Your: Stosvet Press, 2009), translated into English by Boris Dralyuk

Woolf died in the US in 2011.

References

Moldovan writers